The 2022 Split local elections were elections for the 73rd Mayor of Split, the two deputy mayors and the 31 members of the Split City Council, as well as city district councils. Elections will be held on 26 June 2022.

Snap elections were called due to the crisis in the city council, when the current mayor Ivica Puljak lost his majority and when his deputy Bojan Ivošević was charged with threatening a journalist. On April 8, Mayor Puljak and both his deputies resigned, setting a legal 90-day deadline for holding new mayoral elections. In the following days, several councilors also resigned, creating the conditions for holding council elections.

Ivica Puljak won reelection becoming first mayor of Split to do that, while his party Centre won 8 seats more than year before for a total of 15 out of 31 seat.

Candidates 
On 10 June 2022, State Election Committee of Croatia published list of nine candidates for the Mayor and eleven party lists running for the council.

Mayoral election

Council election

Opinion polls

Mayoral election

First round

Second round

Council election

See also 

 2021 Croatian local elections
 2021 Split local elections
 List of mayors in Croatia
 List of mayors of Split

References 

Split 2022
Split local
History of Split, Croatia